The Helpmann Awards are accolades for live entertainment and performing arts in Australia, presented by industry group Live Live Performance Australia (LPA) since 2001.
 
The annual awards recognise achievements in the disciplines of musical theatre, contemporary music, comedy, opera, classical music, theatre, dance and physical theatre. Over forty awards are given to productions, festivals and concerts, and for individuals for their work in performance, direction, choreography, lighting, sound, music, costume and scenic design.

They are named in honour of ballet dancer, choreographer, director and actor Sir Robert Helpmann.

The awards are the Australian equivalent of the United States' Tony Awards for Broadway theatre and the United Kingdom's Laurence Olivier Awards for West End theatre.

History

The Helpmann Awards were established in 2001 by the Australian Entertainment Industry Association (now known as Live Performance Australia (LPA)). They are named in honour of Australian actor, choreographer, dancer and theatre director, Sir Robert Helpmann.

At the inaugural Helpmann Awards, twenty six accolades were handed out for achievements in performance, direction, choreography, lighting, sound, music, costume and scenic design and production, in the disciplines of musical theatre, contemporary music, comedy, opera, classical music, theatre, dance and physical theatre. Over the years the categories expanded and now include many more honours.

Aims and description
The aim of the awards is to promote Australia's live entertainment industry, both locally and internationally, by: recognising artistic achievements; administering the awards with integrity; ensuring the awards are celebrated by the industry and Australian community; and ensuring the ceremony is the most prestigious awards in the local industry and the highlight of each season.

Special non-competitive prizes are also bestowed upon individuals: the JC Williamson Award (named after theatre manager James Cassius Williamson), for one's life's work in Australia's live entertainment industry. This is the highest honour presented by Live Performance Australia. Other special awards are the Sue Nattrass Award, which recognises outstanding achievement in a field without high public profile, the  Brian Stacey Memorial Award, and an award for Best Special Event.

Eligibility and voting
To be eligible for the Helpmann Awards, a production must: be produced or presented by an LPA Member, or professionally produced by a non-Member that has paid an Industry Service Fee for the production; fall within the artistic or industry award categories; and officially open in Australia during the season (or for Best Regional Touring Production Award, undertake its first Australian regional tour during the season).  Exemptions from the entry criteria can be granted in exceptional circumstances by a committee consisting of the LPA president, chief executive and chair of the Helpmann Awards Administration Committee (HAAC).

Nine nominating panels determine the nominees for their respective fields. These are: cabaret, children's presentation, comedy, contemporary music, dance and physical theatre, industry awards, musicals, opera and classical music, and theatre. The nominating panels comprises artists, creatives, arts administrators, writers, journalists, producers, promoters, venue managers and educators. The HAAC selects the chair of each panel, who in turn chooses the members of their respective fields. The nominations are then determined by each of them, who choose four per category. The winners are determined in a secret online ballot by the voters who are employees of LPA members, panelists and previous Helpmann winners and nominees.

Award categories
The award categories are currently:

Theatre
 Best Play
 Best Direction of a Play
 Best Male Actor in a Play
 Best Female Actor in a Play
 Best Male Actor in a Supporting Role – Play
 Best Female Actor in a Supporting Role – Play

Musicals
 Best Musical
 Best Direction of a Musical
 Best Choreography in a Musical
 Best Male Actor in a Musical
 Best Female Actor in a Musical
 Best Male Actor in a Supporting Role – Musical
 Best Female Actor in a Supporting Role – Musical 

Opera and classical music
 Best Opera
 Best Symphony Orchestra Concert
 Best Chamber and Instrumental Ensemble Concert
 Best Direction of an Opera
 Best Male Performer in an Opera
 Best Female Performer in an Opera
 Best Male Performer in a Supporting Role – Opera
 Best Female Performer in a Supporting Role – Opera
 Best Individual Classical Music Performance

Dance and physical theatre
Best Ballet
Best Dance Production
 Best Visual or Physical Theatre Production
 Best Choreography in a Dance or Physical Theatre Production
 Best Male Dancer in a Dance or Physical Theatre Production
 Best Female Dancer in a Dance or Physical Theatre Production

Contemporary music
 Best International Contemporary Concert
 Best Australian Contemporary Concert
 Best Contemporary Music Festival

Other
 Best Regional Touring Production
 Best Comedy Performer
 Best Cabaret Performer
 Best Presentation for Children

Industry
 Best New Australian Work
 Best Original Score
 Best Music Direction
 Best Costume Design
 Best Scenic Design
 Best Lighting Design
 Best Sound Design

Special awards
 JC Williamson Award
 Sue Nattrass Award
 Brian Stacey Memorial Award
 Best Special Event

Retired
 Best Ballet or Dance Work
Best Classical Concert Presentation
Best Contemporary Concert Presentation
Best Live Music Presentation
Best Performance in an Australian Contemporary Concert

Ceremony
The annual Helpmann Awards ceremony is usually held between May and September. They have been variously held in Sydney at the Star City Show Room, Sydney Lyric, Sydney Opera House and the Capitol Theatre, and at the Arts Centre Melbourne. Australian stage and screen actor Simon Burke has presided over the event seven times, the most of any other person, from 2001 to 2006, and again in 2012. The awards have been broadcast since 2004 on various Foxtel channels, and since 2018 live on ABC Television.

 Each year is linked to the full list of winners and nominees from that year following the ceremony.

References

External links
 
 Helpmann Awards trophy picture

 
Australian theatre awards
Australian music awards